William St John Harding (1 January 1835 – 26 December 1903) was a member of the Queensland Legislative Assembly.

Biography
Harding was born at County Cork, Ireland, the son of William Seymore St.John Harding. He was the licensee for the Talawanta Inn in Walgett N.S.W from 1868 to 1870. On arrival in Queensland he acquired grazing farms and was the licensee for the Mt Cornish Hotel in Muttaburra as well as the Emu Park Hotel.

He was married to Catherine Berry in Roma in 1871 and died in Rockhampton on Boxing Day, 1903 and buried in the South Rockhampton Cemetery.

Public life
Harding, an Independent, won the seat of Rockhampton North at the 1893 Queensland colonial election. He held it for one term, losing at the 1896 Queensland colonial election.

References

Members of the Queensland Legislative Assembly
1835 births
1903 deaths
19th-century Australian politicians